Chembe is a constituency of the National Assembly of Zambia. It covers Chembe and Kundamfuma in Chembe District of Luapula Province, and was created in 2016 when the former Chembe constituency was renamed Milenge.

List of MPs

References

Constituencies of the National Assembly of Zambia
2016 establishments in Zambia
Constituencies established in 2016